"Sorry Not Sorry" is a song by American singer Bryson Tiller. It was sent to urban radio on June 21, 2016, as the third single from his debut studio album, Trapsoul (2015). The song was written by Tiller, Jetmir Salii and Timothy Mosley.

Background and release
"Sorry Not Sorry" originally premiered in December 2014, via Tiller's SoundCloud page. In October 2015, he released his debut studio album, Trapsoul, which also included this track. On June 21, 2016, "Sorry Not Sorry" was sent to urban radio as the album's third official single. While talking about the recording sessions of the song in an interview with Billboard, Tiller said:

Music video
The song's music video premiered via Tiller's Vevo channel on October 14, 2015. It was filmed in Louisville, Kentucky and was directed by David M. Helman.

Covers and remixes
In October 2015, English rapper Avelino released his cover version of "Sorry Not Sorry". In November 2015, American rapper Fabolous released his remix of the song, which appeared on his mixtape, Summertime Shootout.

Charts

Weekly charts

Year-end charts

Certifications

References

External links

2015 songs
2016 singles
RCA Records singles
Bryson Tiller songs
Songs written by Bryson Tiller
Songs written by Timbaland